Harry Leslie Van Trees (born June 27, 1930) is a scientist specializing in radar, sonar, communications and signal processing.

Academic career

Van Trees attended West Point, where he graduated first in his class in 1952. 

After Van Trees served in the Army, he received a Master of Science in Electrical Engineering from the University of Maryland. He then attended the Massachusetts Institute of Technology (MIT) and received his Sc.D. After graduating, Van Trees joined the MIT faculty as a part of the Electrical Engineering Department.

Professional contributions

While working at Massachusetts Institute of Technology (MIT) during 1968-1971, Van Trees published a three-volume series of textbooks on the detection, estimation, and modulation theory. Van Trees' theory provided a "unified approach to communications, radar, and sonar."

In addition to academic work, Van Trees has also assisted with the implementation of theory into practice in several Department of Defense positions. Van Trees was initially on loan to the government by MIT, he then ended up staying for a number of projects. Van Trees was the Chief Scientist of the U.S. Air Force. He also served as the Principal Deputy Assistant Secretary of Defense (C3I). Additionally, Van Trees was the Assistant Secretary of Defense for Networks and Information Integration; Command, Control, Communications and Intelligence (C3I).  From 1982-1988, Van Trees ran the Eastern Operations of M/A-Com Linkabit, a company founded by Irwin M. Jacobs and Andrew Viterbi.  The M/A-Com division was sold to Science Applications International Corporation (SAIC) in 1988.

In 1987, Van Trees joined George Mason University (GMU) as a Distinguished Professor of Information Technology, and Electrical and Systems Engineering. Van Trees was also the founding director of Mason's Center of Excellence in Command, Control, Communications and Intelligence (C3I). In 2002, Van Trees published the fourth volume of his textbook titled Optimum Array Processing. This textbook provided a more comprehensive look at optimum array processing. In 2013, Van Trees worked with Dr. Kristine L. Bell and Dr. Zhi Tian, both of GMU, to publish a second edition of the first volume. This version was revised and expanded.

Van Trees is also the creator of the family of Bayesian bounds. The first bound was published in 1964; and in 2007, Van Trees collaborated with Bell to publish Bayesian Bounds for Parameter Estimation and Nonlinear Filter/Tracking.

Van Trees also worked with two colleagues from M/A-Com and founded CommQuest Technologies Inc. CommQuest was a "developer and supplier of advanced semiconductors for wireless comms." CommQuest was purchased by IBM in 1999. Van Trees and his wife established the Harry and Diane Van Trees Electrical Engineering and Computer Science Endowment at West Point.

Recent awards

In 2015, Harry Van Trees was awarded the IEEE Jack S. Kilby Signal Processing Medal. The award is presented for outstanding achievement in signal processing theory, technology, or commerce. Van Trees was inducted into the National Academy of Engineering in 2015.

Personal life 
Van Trees has been married to Diane Enright since April 25, 1953. They have seven children, 19 grandchildren, and 12 great-grandchildren.

References 

1930 births
Living people
MIT School of Engineering alumni
People associated with radar
Sonar
United States Army officers
United States Military Academy alumni
University of Maryland, College Park alumni
MIT School of Engineering faculty
American textbook writers
Place of birth missing (living people)
United States Department of Defense officials
United States Air Force civilians
George Mason University faculty